Nyssa  is a city in Malheur County, Oregon, United States. The population was 3,267 at the 2010 census. The city is located along the Snake River on the Idaho border, in the region of far eastern Oregon known as the "Treasure Valley".  It is part of the Ontario, OR–ID Micropolitan Statistical Area.

The primary industry in the region is agriculture, including the cultivation of Russet potatoes, sugar beets, onions, corn, flower seed, mint, and wheat. The city's economy relies on the surrounding agricultural area with its several large onion and potato packaging plants.

History
The area surrounding the city was originally inhabited by Native Americans. Northern Paiute and Cayuse frequented the area but had difficulty living in the relatively harsh climate. The original Fort Boise, established in the 1830s, is nearby to the southeast. The city was originally a shipping center for sheep and stock on the Union Pacific's main trunk line.

Experiments with growing sugar beets were begun in 1935 by R. H. Tallman, the Idaho district manager of the Amalgamated Sugar Company. Successful yields led to the first Amalgamated-designed and built factory, which began operation on October 9, 1938.

In 1942, during World War II, Japanese Americans who had been removed from their West Coast homes worked in a farm labor camp outside Nyssa. Most of these internees came from the Portland Assembly Center and had volunteered to work in the Farm Security Administration camp to avoid incarceration. The camp consisted of approximately 100 canvas tents, each containing a wood stove and a bare light bulb, as well as laundry and bathroom facilities and one public tent used for meetings, dances and church services. Although the facilities were not fenced in and the laborers were trucked into Nyssa once a week for recreation and shopping, Japanese Americans were subject to a curfew and were not permitted to leave the camp without an escort. A total of some 400 men, women and children worked in the Nyssa camp, with a peak population of about 350. In November 1942, the tents being insufficient to keep out the winter cold, the camp was closed and most of the laborers moved to other FSA camps or private farms, or found employment and remained in Eastern Oregon (outside of the "exclusion zone" from which Japanese Americans were denied entry).

Near the end of the war, a branch camp for German and Italian prisoners of war from Camp Rupert, near Buhl, Idaho, was established. Those POWs helped with the sugar beet industry, typically through thinning and harvesting.

From 1936 until 2005, the Amalgamated Sugar Company (White Satin brand) owned and operated a sugar-processing plant that served as the city's main source of commerce. The closing of the plant resulted in the loss of 600 seasonal jobs. The Nyssa plant just a few years previously had produced more sugar than anywhere else for Amalgamated Sugar.  To date the plant has been stripped of everything except the brown sugar line.  The mechanic shop is still running.  Beets are shipped to Nampa, Idaho. Nyssa also had a greenhouse and testing facilities which were later moved to Twin Falls.

Geography

Climate
According to the Köppen Climate Classification system, Nyssa has a semi-arid climate, abbreviated "BSk" on climate maps.

Demographics

2010 census
As of the census of 2010, there were 3,267 people, 1,051 households, and 758 families residing in the city. The racial makeup of the city was 63.1% White, 0.3% African American, 0.7% Native American, 1.3% Asian, 30.9% from other races, and 3.8% from two or more races. Hispanic or Latino of any race were 60.5% of the population.

There were 1,051 households, of which 45.1% had children under the age of 18 living with them, 50.0% were married couples living together, 14.2% had a female householder with no husband present, 7.9% had a male householder with no wife present, and 27.9% were non-families. 24.5% of all households were made up of individuals, and 13% had someone living alone who was 65 years of age or older. The average household size was 3.08 and the average family size was 3.71.

The median age in the city was 30.1 years. 34.5% of residents were under the age of 18; 9.3% were between the ages of 18 and 24; 23.7% were from 25 to 44; 19.3% were from 45 to 64; and 13.1% were 65 years of age or older. The gender makeup of the city was 50.1% male and 49.9% female.

Education
It is in the Nyssa School District 26.

Notable people 
 John Bates (American football) (born 1997)

References

External links

 City of Nyssa (official website)
 Entry for Nyssa in the Oregon Blue Book

 
Ontario, Oregon micropolitan area
1903 establishments in Oregon
Populated places established in 1903
Cities in Oregon
Cities in Malheur County, Oregon